Pakistan Islamic Medical Association (PIMA) was established in Oct, 1979. Since its inception, PIMA has been striving to achieve its goals in professional and training of doctors, calling its members and associates towards Islamic way of life through its regular Dawah and training workshops and seminars. PIMA played a significant role in enrichment of professional skills through regular hands on workshops to meet the requirements of the country in particular and of international community during wars, disaster and peace. PIMA relief remained always on the fore fronts during National and international disasters like earthquakes, tsunami, floods, cyclones and wars. PIMA has established medical institutions of international repute contributing in quality medical, dental and allied specialties. Through its regular contribution in health awareness, education and community services PIMA has been regularly struggling for upbringing the health of the masses. The health institutions of PIMA like hospitals, clinics, free medical camps and specialized campaigns remained instrumental alleviating the suffering of those who are otherwise not cared. PIMA has developed specialized expertise in managing disasters of all sorts whether man-made or natural. PIMA Project Prevention of Blindness Trust has remarkable services for the prevention of blindness national & International Levels. PIMA established projects of international repute in collaboration with FIMA, like Consortium of Islamic medical colleges (CIMCO), Islamic Hospital Consortium (IHC), FIMA save vision, FIMA save dignity and many other projects. PIMA's mega projects like Peshawar Medical College and Mega pharmaceutical industry are remarkable achievements serving the community at large.

Mission
Islamic prophet Muhammad said “Allah Almighty creates no disease without creating a cure for it as well” and “the superiority of the learned over the mere pins is like the superiority of the moon when it is full over all other stars and the ink of the sailors is more previous than the Good of the martyrs”; these sayings direct us towards reaching for unknown cures and medical research is thus our religions duty.

Aims and objectives
 To motivate doctors to follow the basic tenets of Islam.
 To use the contact with public for propagation of Islam.
 To organize, ideological, moral and professional training of member doctors.
 To help align the National Health Policy according to the principles of Islam.

History
The history dates back to 1979, when fifty doctors from all over Pakistan met at students teachers center (STC) of the Punjab University, Lahore in the month of October. They laid down the foundation of an organization named as Pakistan Doctors Forum (PDF), a fraternity of medical profession. PDF carried on its mission for two years, initially by emphasizing more an organizational work and the membership drive. It was April 1981, convention of PDF was held in Rawalpindi. This forum was renamed as "Pakistan Islamic Medical Association" (PIMA) and its constitution was approved. PIMA is an active member of Federation of Islamic Medical Association (FIMA), an international forum for collaboration of all Islamic medical associations around the globe. In the journey through 25 years, PIMA has emerged as a strong forum for Muslim medical professionals to excel in profession, ethics and provide relief to oppressed humanity in the country and around the globe as well.

Projects
 Training & Development
 Prevention of Blindness Trust
 PIMA Relief
 Al Hajiri Hospital Muzafar Abad AJK
 PIMA Hospital Mansehra KPK
 Health Awareness
 Kashmir Surgical Hospital
 Peshawar Medical College
 PIMA Female Branch
 PIMA Students Branch
 Tibbi Fiqhi Board
 PIMA International Affairs

References

External links
 
 Home (Project website)
 Pakistan Islamic Medical Association - PIMA (Facebook)
 Pakistan Homeopathic Medical college

Medical and health organisations based in Pakistan